Bootham School is a private Quaker boarding school, on Bootham in the city of York in England. It accepts boys and girls ages 3–19, and had an enrolment of 605 pupils in 2016. It is one of seven Quaker schools in England.

The school was founded by the Religious Society of Friends (Quakers) and opened on 6 January 1823 in Lawrence Street, York. Its first headmaster was William Simpson (1823–1828). He was followed by John Ford (1828-c.1865). The school is now on Bootham, near York Minster, in a building originally built in 1804 for Sir Richard Vanden Bempde Johnstone.

The school's motto Membra Sumus Corporis Magni means "We are members of a greater body", quoting Seneca the Younger (Epistle 95, 52).

Academics
Bootham was ranked at 43rd in the 2011 Independent Schools A-Levels League Tables.

Notable alumni
Notable former pupils include the 19th-century parliamentary leader John Bright, the mathematician Lewis Fry Richardson ("father of fractals"), the physicist and electrical engineer Silvanus P. Thompson, the historian A. J. P. Taylor, the actor-manager Brian Rix, the applied linguist Stephen Pit Corder, the leading child psychiatrist Sir Michael Rutter, the famous social reformer Seebohm Rowntree, the 1959 Nobel Peace Prize winner Philip Noel-Baker, Cabinet Secretary Sir Jeremy Heywood, singer-songwriter Benjamin Francis Leftwich, the chief executive of Marks & Spencer Stuart Rose and Jon Ingle, better known as drag artist Lady Bunny.

See also

List of Friends Schools

References

Further reading
Bootham School Register. Compiled under the direction of a committee of O.Y.S.A., 1914, with revised eds. 1935, 1971, 2010.
JS Rowntree, Friends' Boys' School, York a Sketch of its History 1829–1878 (1879)
FE Pollard Bootham School 1823–1923 (JM Dent and Sons, 1926)
SK Brown Bootham School York 1823–1973 (author, 1973)

External links

Official website

Educational institutions established in 1823
Private schools in York
Member schools of the Headmasters' and Headmistresses' Conference
Quaker schools in England
Boarding schools in North Yorkshire
1823 establishments in England
Bootham